Blue dot or blue dots may refer to:

Companies and organizations
 Blue Dot, the former name of the Faves.com social bookmarking website
 Bluedot Innovation, an Australian smartphone location technology company
 Blue Dot Network, a multi-stakeholder initiative to promote standards for global infrastructure development
 BlueDot, a Canadian software company

Animals
 Blue Dot Ray, Taeniura lymma, a species of stingray
 Blue Dot Grouper, Cephalopholis argus, an Indo-Pacific fish
 Blue dot triplefin, Notoclinops caerulepunctus a New Zealand area fish
 Blue dot jawfish, Opistognathus rosenblatti a Gulf of California jawfish

Other
 Blue dot taillights, blue crystals inside tail lights in 1940s, or later retro style, cars
 Blue-dot task, a question inserted in a questionnaire to identify respondents who are not paying attention
 "Blue Dots", an episode of the TV sitcom Raising Hope
 Bluedot Festival, an annual music and science festival held at Jodrell Bank Observatory
 Blue Dot, a science radio show produced by North State Public Radio

See also
 Pale Blue Dot (disambiguation)